Gangster  is a 2014 Malayalam language neo-noir action thriller film directed by Aashiq Abu. The film stars Mammootty plays the lead role, along with Sekhar Menon, John Paul, Kunchan, T. G. Ravi, Nyla Usha and Aparna Gopinath, Alexx O'Nell, Hareesh Peradi and Dileesh Pothan in supporting roles. The film was written by Ahmed Sidhique and Abhilash S. Kumar, with music by Deepak Dev. The film released on 12 April 2014.

Premise
Akbar Ali Khan is a powerful kingpin in Mangalore underworld, and shares his business with two other prominent kingpins, Samuel Pandhare alias Uncle Sam and Mani Menon. Under their rule, the city remains calm, until Anto, the grandson of Uncle Sam and a drug baron, decides to import contaminated drug vaccines from abroad to sell them at a very high rate. But Akbar opposes the plan, and Anto try to kill Akbar, but the plan fails when Akbar's wife Sana dies and Akbar gets brutal injuries. Akbar is saved by his uncle Hajikka and helps him to take revenge, with the helps of Vithura, Hajikka's henchmen and Akbar's lieutenant Michael, Akbar kills Uncle Sam and Mani. Akbar finally finds out through Vithura that Anto is hiding in a beach resort at Goa with a group of Russian mobsters. Akbar's men gets killed by the Russians and Akbar kills them, though he got injured by them and finally he brutally kills Anto using a Machete.

Cast
 Mammootty as Akbar Ali Khan
 Sekhar Menon as Anto Pandhare
 John Paul as Samuel "Uncle Sam" Pandhare
 Kunchan as Mani Menon
 T. G. Ravi as Hajikka
 Nyla Usha as Sana Ibrahim Khan
 Aparna Gopinath as Lilly
 Alexx O'Nell as Tom
 Hareesh Peradi as Michael
 Dileesh Pothan as DYSP Vithura Chengalath
 Parvathi Menon
 RJ Renu

Casting
The film was expected to have Fahadh Faasil and Meera Jasmine or Rima Kallingal to play major roles with Mammootty. Later, Nyla Usha was cast to play the female lead opposite Mammootty. Also, Aparna Gopinath was roped in to play another female lead. Mammootty reportedly had lost 10 kg to play the role of Akbar Ali Khan in the film. The film also features John Paul, T. G. Ravi, Sekhar Menon, Kunchan, Hareesh Peradi, Dileesh Pothan and Alexx O'Nell in supporting roles.

Production and release
Gangster was scheduled to be shot after the completion of Aashiq Abu's Salt N' Pepper, but was postponed several times to finally start shooting from 15 December 2013.

In an online poll conducted by One India, Gangster was voted as the most awaited Malayalam film of the year. The film was released on 11 April as a Vishu release with the date being adjusted due to national elections.

Reception

Critical reception
The film received highly negative reviews from critics, criticising the "poor" and "unimpressive" script, slow pacing, dialogues, casting and repeatative costume design given to actors.  with positive comments about the background score, climax fight and cinematography.

Veeyen of Nowrunning.com rated the film 2 out of 5 and said, "The even sag that painfully persists throughout, the mindless gunshots and blood splatter and the sodden predictability together blow up this film beyond recognition. And no amount of crashing and crunching can salvage an entertainer from the massive debris that it leaves behind."" Raj Vikram of Metromatinee.com said, "Gangster proves to be a half baked, shoddily made and unimaginative film. Without a speck of novelty it ends up as a routine revenge drama devoid of thrills. Painfully paced and lacking in an engaging plot the film huffs and puffs into a disappointing end".

Padmakumar of Malayala Manorama rated the film  1.5 out of 5 and concluded his review saying, "With all its thunderous background score, dramatic slow motions, white-skinned cons, wowing locations, flamboyant frames and sleek cars, the film never fails from disappointing you to the core." Tony Mathew, also from Malayala Manorama, gave the movie a negative review and said that "Gangster is a disaster".

Ajin Krishna of Oneindia.in said, "The movie Gangster works only for its different style, performances, music, visuals and the engaging climax sequences. Rest is pretty much average." Sify.com's reviewer said, "Gangster is perhaps an act of impudence, with scant regard for the time and money of the viewer. It's not easy to sit through this boring film even for a hardcore Mammootty fan."

References

External links
 

2014 films
Indian crime drama films
2014 crime drama films
2010s Malayalam-language films
Films shot in Goa
Films shot in Kochi
Films shot in Mangalore
Films shot in Rajasthan
Indian gangster films
Films directed by Aashiq Abu